Class  55 may refer to:
Belgian Railways Class 55 - class of 42 diesel locomotives built 1961–62
British Rail Class 55, a British diesel locomotive
 DRG Class 55, a German freight locomotive class with an 0-8-0 wheel arrangement run by the Deutsche Reichsbahn and comprising the following sub-classes:
 Class  55.0-6: Prussian G 7.1, PKP Class  Tp1, LBE G 7
 Class  55.7-14: Prussian G 7.2, PKP Class  Tp2
 Class  55.15: ČSD Class  413.1
 Class  55.16-22: Prussian G 8, PKP Class  Tp3
 Class  55.23-24: Prussian G 9
 Class  55.25-57: Prussian G 8.1, PKP Class  Tp4
 Class  55.57: Mecklenburg  G 7.2
 Class  55.57-58II: BBÖ 73, ČSD Class  414.0, PKP Class  Tp15, JDŽ 133
 Class  55.58: Mecklenburg  G 8.1
 Class  55.59: Palatine G 5
 Class  55.59II: BBÖ 174, PKP Class  Tp17, PKP Class  Tp106 
 Class  55.60: Saxon I V
 Class  55.60II: ČSD Class  413.2 
 Class  55.61: PKP Class  Tp6, PKP Class  Tp108, PKP Class  Tp109, PKP Class  Tp104, PKP Class  Tp102
 Class  55.62: Oldenburg G 7
 Class  55.62II: JDŽ 132
 Class  55.70: BBÖ 571
 Class  55.71: ČSD Class  402.0, ČSD Class  402.2, ČSD Class  403.2
 Class  55.72: Palatine G 4.I
 Class  55.72, 55.81: Prussian G 8.1s left in the DR in East Germany after 1945